Eugeniusz Marcin Kazimirowski (November 11, 1873 – September 23, 1939 in Białystok) was a Polish painter and member of the realism movement. He is best known for the first depiction of the Divine Mercy image in 1934, based on a request from Faustyna Kowalska and her confessor Michael Sopoćko.

Background

Kazimirowski studied painting at the Kraków Academy of Fine Arts 1892–1897. He continued his studies in Munich, Paris and Rome. After World War I, he moved from Kraków to Wilno. He taught at the Wilno Teacher Training Institute and worked on theatrical design in Wilno. He painted mostly landscapes and portraits.

Kazimirowski's Divine Mercy was first shown in public at the Easter ceremonies of April 25–28, 1934, and the first Mass with the Divine Mercy image was celebrated by Rev. Michael Sopoćko at the Gate of Dawn church in Wilno, on April 28, 1935 the second Easter Sunday, long before the Vatican approved the term Divine Mercy Sunday in 2000.

In 1936, Kazimirowski moved to the city of Białystok, where he became involved in marketing tourism. He died there in 1939. Sr. Dominika Stec of the Sisters of the Merciful Jesus (the order St. Faustina wrote about founding in her diary) spoke in an interview on The Original Image of Divine Mercy: The Untold Story of an Unknown Masterpiece, explaining that Kazimirowski "presumably died of pneumonia", but that "The real cause of Mr. Kazimirowski's death is unknown." She describes the era of his death as being difficult and occurring closely after the Communist invasion. The film proceeds to hint that his death may have been caused by "an unkind visit by the merciless NKVD predecessors of the KGB."

Most of Kazimirowski's works were lost in World War II.

See also
 Adolf Hyła
 Divine Mercy
 List of unsolved deaths
 Sanctuary of the Divine Mercy, Vilnius

References

1873 births
1939 deaths
19th-century Polish painters
19th-century Polish male artists
20th-century Polish painters
20th-century Polish male artists
Artists from Białystok
Divine Mercy
Polish male painters
Unsolved deaths